Gregory "Greg" J. Deighan (born 15 October 1939) was the Speaker of the Legislative Assembly of Prince Edward Island, Canada. He was a member of the Progressive Conservative Party, representing the Wilmot-Summerside electoral district.

In May 2000, Deighan was appointed to the Executive Council of Prince Edward Island as Minister of Tourism. In August 2002, Deighan was moved to Minister of Fisheries and Aquaculture. He served as Speaker of the Legislative Assembly from 2003 to 2007.

He did not stand for re-election in the 2007 general election.

References

Living people
Members of the Executive Council of Prince Edward Island
People from Summerside, Prince Edward Island
Progressive Conservative Party of Prince Edward Island MLAs
Speakers of the Legislative Assembly of Prince Edward Island
21st-century Canadian politicians
1956 births